The 2000 season is the 78th season of competitive football in Ecuador.

National leagues

Serie A
Champion: Olmedo (1st title)
International cup qualifiers:
2001 Copa Libertadores: Olmedo, El Nacional, Emelec
Relegated: LDU Quito, Técnico Universitario

Serie B
Winner: LDU Portoviejo (5th title)
Promoted: LDU Portoviejo, Delfín
Relegated: Panamá

Segunda
Winner: UDJ Quinindé
Promoted: UDJ Quinindé

Clubs in international competitions

National teams

Senior team
The Ecuador national team played in sixteen matches in 2000: ten FIFA World Cup qualifiers and six friendlies.

2002 FIFA World Cup qualifiers
Qualification for the 2002 FIFA World Cup began in 2000.

Friendlies

Notes
1.Ecuador fielded its Olympic team, but the match is a full FIFA international.

External links
 National leagues details on RSSSF

 
2000